Kofi Abrefa Busia (born 11 July 1913 – 28 August 1978) was a Ghanaian political leader and academic who was Prime Minister of Ghana from 1969 to 1972. As a nationalist leader and prime minister, he helped to restore civilian government to the country following military rule.

Early life and education
Busia was born a Bono prince in the traditional kingdom of Wenchi, in the Brong Ahafo Region, one of the four Gold Coast Territories, then under British rule and now called Ghana.

He was educated at Methodist School, Wenchi, Mfantsipim School, Cape Coast, then at Wesley College, Kumasi, from 1931 to 1932. He taught at Wesley College and left to study at Achimota College in 1935 and taught there. He gained his first degree with Honours in Medieval and Modern History from the University of London, through correspondence during this period. He then went on to study at University College, Oxford, where he was the college's first African student. He returned to the Gold Coast in 1942.  He took a BA (Hons) in Philosophy, Politics, and Economics (1941, MA 1946) and a DPhil in Social Anthropology in 1947 at Nuffield College, Oxford, with a thesis entitled "The position of the chief in the modern political system of Ashanti: a study of the influence of contemporary social changes on Ashanti political institutions". He was a Fulbright scholar in 1954.

Career
Busia served as a district commissioner from 1942 to 1949, and was appointed first lecturer in African Studies. He became the first African to occupy a chair at the University College of the Gold Coast (now the University of Ghana). In 1951 he was elected by the Ashanti Confederacy to the Legislative Council. In 1952, he was Leader of Ghana Congress Party, which later merged with the other opposition parties to form the United Party (UP).

As leader of the opposition against Kwame Nkrumah, he fled the country on the grounds that his life was under threat. In 1959, Busia became a Professor of Sociology and Culture of Africa at the University of Leiden near the Hague, Netherlands. From 1962 until 1969, he was a Fellow of St Antony's College, Oxford.

He returned to Ghana in March 1966, after Nkrumah's government was overthrown by the military, to serve on the National Liberation Council (NLC) of General Joseph Ankrah, the military head of state; and was appointed as the Chairman of the National Advisory Committee of the NLC. In 1967/68, Busia served as the Chairman of the Centre for Civic Education. He used this opportunity to promote himself as the next leader. He also was a Member of the Constitutional Review Committee. When the NLC lifted the ban on politics, Busia, together with Lawyer Sylvester Kofi Williams and friends in the defunct UP formed the Progress Party (PP).

In 1969, the PP won the parliamentary elections with 105 of the 140 seats. This paved the way for him to become the next Prime Minister. Busia continued with NLC's anti-Nkrumaist stance and adopted a liberalised economic system. There was a mass deportation of half a million Nigerian citizens from Ghana, and a 44 percent devaluation of the cedi in 1971, which met with a lot of resistance from the public.

While he was in Britain for a medical check-up, the army under Colonel Ignatius Kutu Acheampong overthrew his government on 13 January 1972. Busia remained in exile in England and returned to Oxford University, where he died from a heart attack in August 1978.

Busia's name is associated with Ghana's political right, along with J. B. Danquah and S. D. Dombo. The New Patriotic Party has claimed the Danquah-Busia-Dombo mantle in the Fourth Republic.

Bibliography
 The Position of the Chief in the Modern Political System of Ashanti. London, 1951 (orig. dissertation, Oxford)
 The Sociology and Culture of Africa. Leiden, 1960
 The Challenge of Africa. New York, 1962
 Purposeful Education for Africa. The Hague, 1964
 Urban Churches in Britain. London, 1966
 Africa in Search of Democracy. London, 1967

References

External links
Ghana-pedia webpage – Dr Kofi A. Busia
Ghanaweb about Dr. Busia
Busia Foundation

1913 births
1978 deaths
Alumni of Nuffield College, Oxford
Alumni of the University of London
Alumni of University College, Oxford
Fellows of St Antony's College, Oxford
Fulbright alumni
Ghana Congress Party politicians
Ghanaian democracy activists
Ghanaian Methodists
Ghanaian MPs 1951–1954
Ghanaian MPs 1954–1956
Ghanaian MPs 1956–1965
Ghanaian MPs 1969–1972
Ghanaian royalty
Leaders ousted by a coup
Academic staff of Leiden University
Mfantsipim School alumni
People from Brong-Ahafo Region
Prime ministers of Ghana
Progress Party (Ghana) politicians
United Party (Ghana) politicians
Academic staff of the University of Ghana